Berberis quinquefolia is a shrub in the family Berberidaceae, first described as a species in 1918. The species is endemic to Mexico, reported from the States of Puebla and Durango.

References

External links
photo of herbarium specimen at Missouri Botanical Garden, isotype of Odostemon quinquefolius Standl

quinquefolia
Flora of Mexico
Plants described in 1918